All My Life is the second studio album by Canadian country music artist Jim Witter. It was released in 1999 by Curb Records. It includes the Top 10 singles "All My Life", "Jumpin' Right In", "Tough as a Pickup Truck" and "One Beat at a Time" and a cover of Cheap Trick's "I Want You to Want Me".

Track listing

References

1999 albums
Jim Witter albums
Curb Records albums